Round Mountain is an unincorporated community in Faulkner County, Arkansas, United States. Round Mountain is located on the southern border of Conway.

References

Unincorporated communities in Faulkner County, Arkansas
Unincorporated communities in Arkansas